The Communist Organization of Spain (Bandera Roja) (Spanish: Organización Comunista de España (Bandera Roja), Catalan: Organització Comunista d'Espanya - Bandera Roja; OCE-BR), commonly known as Bandera Roja (red flag) was a Maoist communist party in Spain. The newspaper of the organization was Bandera Roja.

History
OCE-BR was founded in 1970 as a split of the PSUC by a sector of its youth wing. The original name was Communist Organization-Red Flag. In 1973 OCE-BR adopted its later name and expanded throughout all Spain. The main goal of the organization was a democratic revolution against the Francoist State, as the first step towards a full socialist revolution.

OCE-BR was legalized in late 1977. The same year the party suffered a split in Catalonia. The splitters, led by Joan Oms i Llohis, founded the Communist Collective of Catalonia. In 1989 OCE-BR joined the PSUC again, finally disappearing as an organization in 1994.

References

Political parties established in 1970
Political parties disestablished in 1994
Communist parties in Spain
Defunct communist parties in Spain
Defunct Maoist parties
Maoist organizations in Europe